The Archdiocese of Częstochowa is an archdiocese located in the city of Częstochowa in Poland.

History

 October 28, 1925: Established as Diocese of Częstochowa. Its serves as a suffragan diocese to the newly formed Archdiocese of Krakow 
 March 25, 1992: Promoted as Metropolitan Archdiocese of Częstochowa

Special churches

 Minor Basilica, National Shrine:  Bazylika Jasnogórska Wniebowzięcia N.M.P. / Sanktuarium Najświętszej Maryi Panny Częstochowskiej (Jasna Góra Basilica of the Assumption of the Blessed Virgin Mary), Częstochowa
 Minor Basilica:  Bazylika pw. Wniebowzięcia Najświętszej Maryi Panny (OO Dominikanów) (Basilica of the Assumption of the Blessed Virgin Mary), Gidle

Leadership
 Bishops of Częstochowa (Roman rite):
 Bishop Teodor Kubina (1925.12.14 – 1951.02.13)
 Bishop Zdzislaw Goliński (1951.04.22 – 1963.07.06)
 Bishop Stefan Bareła (1964.01.17 – 1984.02.12)
 Bishop Stanisław Nowak (1984.10.26 – 1992.03.25)
 Archbishops of Częstochowa (Roman rite):
 Archbishop Stanisław Nowak (1992.03.25 – 2011.12.29)
 Archbishop Wacław Depo (since 2011.12.29)

Suffragan dioceses
 Radom
 Sosnowiec

See also
Roman Catholicism in Poland
Minor Seminary of the Archdiocese of Częstochowa

Sources
 GCatholic.org
 Catholic Hierarchy
  Diocese website

Roman Catholic dioceses in Poland
Christian organizations established in 1925
Częstochowa
Roman Catholic dioceses and prelatures established in the 20th century